The Black Reel Award for Television for Outstanding Writing, Comedy Series is an annual award given in honor of a writer or writers who produced an outstanding story or screenplay for an episode of a television comedy series during the primetime network season episode of the year.

2010s

2020s

Programs with multiple awards

2 awards
 Atlanta (consecutive)

Programs with multiple nominations

6 nominations
 black-ish
 Insecure

3 nominations
 Atlanta

Total awards by network
 FX - 2
 HULU - 2
 ABC - 1

Individuals with multiple awards

2 wins
 Donald Glover

Individuals with multiple nominations

3 nominations 
 Issa Rae

2 nominations 
 Donald Glover
 Natasha Rothwell
 Peter Saji

References

Black Reel Awards